Greatness Brickworks is a  geological Site of Special Scientific Interest in Sevenoaks in Kent. It is a Geological Conservation Review site. 

This Cretaceous site is highly fossiliferous, with many ammonites. It is described by Natural England as "of vital importance in biostratigraphic research on the Gault of the Weald".

The site is private land with no public access.

References

Sites of Special Scientific Interest in Kent
Geological Conservation Review sites